Farming Simulator 2012 (Farming Simulator 3D for the U.S. 3DS version) is a simulation video game in the Farming Simulator series, developed by Giants Software and Astragon for Nintendo 3DS, iOS, and Android in 2012-2013.

Reception

The 3DS and iOS versions received "mixed" reviews according to the review aggregation website Metacritic. In Japan, where the 3DS version was ported and published by Intergrow under the name  on April 4, 2013, Famitsu gave it a score of two sixes, one four, and one five for a total of 21 out of 40.

References

External links
 

2012 video games
Android (operating system) games
Farming video games
Focus Entertainment games
IOS games
Nintendo 3DS games
Simulation video games
Single-player video games
Video games developed in Germany